Marko Trifković (Belgrade, 6 September 1864 – Belgrade, 26 July 1928) was a Serbian politician who held the post of Prime Minister of Serbia.

References

1864 births
1928 deaths
People from Ćuprija
Government ministers of Serbia
19th-century Serbian people
Grand Crosses of the Order of the White Lion
Foreign ministers of Serbia
Interior ministers of Serbia
Justice ministers of Serbia